The 1963 Boston Patriots season was the franchise's 4th season in the American Football League.

In their first season at Fenway Park, switching from Nickerson Field, the Patriots hovered around the .500 mark all season, and were in position to win the Eastern Division title outright with a victory on their final game. The 35–3 road loss to the defending champion Kansas City Chiefs allowed the Buffalo Bills catch up and both finished at 7–6–1, which required a divisional playoff game, the AFL's first. Both teams had a bye the following week, postponed from the Sunday after the assassination of President Kennedy; the tiebreaker playoff was scheduled for Saturday, December 28, at Buffalo's War Memorial Stadium. The teams split their two games during the regular season, with the home team winning, and the host Bills were slight favorites.

The visiting Patriots won the playoff game 26–8 on a snowy field, with quarterback Babe Parilli throwing two touchdown passes to fullback Larry Garron, and three field goals were added by end Gino Cappelletti. With the win, Boston became Eastern Division champions, while the Western champion San Diego Chargers (11–3) were idle. The AFL championship game was played the next week in southern California on January 5, where San Diego routed the Patriots 51–10 at Balboa Stadium.

This was Boston's only postseason appearance during the AFL's ten years; the Patriots' next playoff game was in 1976 (as a wild card) and the next division title came in 1978.

AFL draft

Staff

Roster

Schedule

Standings

Postseason

References 

Boston Patriots
New England Patriots seasons
Boston Patriots
1960s in Boston